The 2011 Crystal Skate of Romania was the 12th edition of an annual senior-level international figure skating competition held in Romania. It was held on November 2011 in Brașov. Skaters competed in the disciplines of single skating on the senior, junior, and novice levels.

Senior results

Men

Ladies

 WD = Withdrew

External links
 Protocol

Crystal Skate Of Romania, 2011
Crystal Skate
November 2011 sports events in Romania